Uska Luke is a river of Brandenburg, Germany.

See also
List of rivers of Brandenburg

Rivers of Brandenburg
Rivers of Germany